David Stoughton Conant (June 17, 1949, Springfield, Vermont – June 27, 2018) was an American botanist, specializing in the systematics and genetics of tropical tree ferns.

Biography
After graduating from Fall Mountain Regional High School, Conant matriculated at the University of New Hampshire. There he received in 1971 a Bachelor of Science degree in botany and was mentored by Albion R. Hodgdon. At Harvard University, Conant graduated with a Ph.D. in botany. His doctoral dissertation was supervised by Rolla M. Tryon Jr.

In 1976 Conant became a faculty member in the Science Department of Lyndon State College (which in 2018 became part of Northern Vermont University). In 2009 he retired from Lyndon State College and donated his personal herbarium of over 3,000 dried botanical specimens to the college. He was the editor-in-chief of the journal Rhodora for a brief period in 1996. He spent sabbatical years at Mount Holyoke College, Dartmouth College, and Duke University.

After retiring from Lyndon State College, Conant started a business doing excavation projects. Later in Barnet, Vermont, he concentrated on working with his wife on their property, where they cleared fields and built a network of roads through wooded areas.

In 1979 he married Aminta Kitfield (honored by the botanical eponym Cyathea amintae). Upon his death he was survived by his widow, three daughters, and four grandchildren.

Awards and honors
 1991 — Edgard T. Wherry Award of the Botanical Society of America for the article Phylogenetic implications of chloroplast DNA variation in the Cyatheaceae coauthored by Diana B. Stein and Angela E. Valinski 
 1996–1998 — President of the New England Botanical Club
 2004–2008 — President of the American Fern Society

Eponyms
 Alsophila conantiana Lehnert

Selected publications

References

External links
 

1949 births
2018 deaths
Conant family
20th-century American botanists
21st-century American botanists
University of New Hampshire alumni
Harvard Graduate School of Arts and Sciences alumni